

Esne (or Esna; died  787) was a medieval Bishop of Hereford. He was consecrated between 781 and 786 and died between 786 and 788.

Citations

References

External links
 

Bishops of Hereford
8th-century English bishops
780s deaths
Year of birth unknown